Josh Gard, better known by his stage name Figure, is an American electronic music producer and DJ.

Career
Figure is largely known for his Monsters series, which features drumstep tracks mixed with horror movie samples. As of 2022, he has released 13 volumes in the series. Since 2012 Universal Studios have enlisted him to supply the soundtrack for their annual event Halloween Horror Nights.

Besides his horror themed releases, Figure has also ventured into traditional electronic music genres. On September 10, 2013, he released an EP titled "Horns of the Apocalypse" through the record label Owsla. Further showcasing his abilities, Figure released a full-length album titled "Gravity" on August 31, 2015.

Figure's song "Monster Mania" was featured on the sixth episode of season eleven of the show, It's Always Sunny in Philadelphia.

Discography

Albums

Monsters series

Extended plays

Singles

References

External links
 Figure's Official Website
 Figure's SoundCloud
 Figure's Facebook
 Figure's Twitter
 Figure Discography at Discogs

American DJs
American electronic musicians
Place of birth missing (living people)
Year of birth missing (living people)
Dubstep musicians
Remixers
Owsla artists
Electronic dance music DJs
Living people